Mogens Benno Therkildsen (born 15 March 1940) is a Danish former footballer who played as a goalkeeper. He competed in the men's tournament at the 1972 Summer Olympics.

References

External links
 

1940 births
Living people
People from Struer Municipality
Danish men's footballers
Association football goalkeepers
Denmark international footballers
Olympic footballers of Denmark
Footballers at the 1972 Summer Olympics
Sportspeople from the Central Denmark Region